Millier is a surname. Notable people with the surname include:

Anne Millier, American ice dancer
Arthur Millier ( 1894–1975), British-born American painter, etcher, and art critic
Harvey Millier, American ice dancer, brother of Anne

See also
Tonne